Rage is a 2009 satirical mystery art film  written and directed by Sally Potter, starring Jude Law and Judi Dench. The filmmakers said that the film created a new genre in filmmaking, called "naked cinema".

Premise 
A young blogger at a New York fashion house shoots behind-the-scenes interviews on his cell phone.

Cast 
 Jude Law as Minx
 Steve Buscemi as Frank
 Judi Dench as Mona Carvell
 John Leguizamo as Jed
 Dianne Wiest as Miss Roth
 Eddie Izzard as Tiny Diamonds
 Riz Ahmed as Vijay
 Bob Balaban as Mr. White
 Lily Cole as Lettuce Leaf
 Patrick J. Adams as Dwight Angel
 David Oyelowo as Homer
 Adriana Barraza as Anita de Los Angeles
 Simon Abkarian as Merlin
 Jakob Cedergren as Otto

Release
The film premiered at the 2009 Berlin International Film Festival and was nominated for the Golden Berlin Bear.

The DVD was released on September 22, 2009, in the US, and September 28, 2009, in the UK. A special edition version of the DVD was released through the official Rage website.

Babelgum premiered the film on mobile phones and internet at the same time as the cinema and DVD release. Babelgum released Rage in the UK, North America, Australia, Italy, France, Germany and Spain.

Rage is the world’s first feature film to debut on mobile phones. The movie was to be shown in seven episodes, beginning on September 21, 2009. The online screening began on September 28, 2009.

Rage had its New York screen premiere on September 21, 2009, at “The Box”.

Reception

The film was widely panned by critics, with criticism mostly focusing on its acting, direction, plot, script and length, as well as that it did not achieve its satirical intentions. On Rotten Tomatoes it has an approval rating of 29% based on reviews from 7 critics.

It has been described as 'lame' and an 'indignant annoyance' by Leslie Felperin of Variety and 'claustrophobic, repetitive and mostly ludicrous' by Richard Mowe of Boxoffice Magazine.

In a rare positive review, Armond White of New York Press described the film as 'a refreshing reminder of true cinematic values'.

References

External links
 
 
 
 Sally Potter Official website
 Gallery Rage, sallypotter.com, accessed February 26, 2009.

 Sally Potter at New York Times, accessed November 4, 2008.
 POLL: Which Actor Makes the Best Lady?, People, originally posted February 4, 2009, accessed April 9, 2009.
 Kevin Maher, Sally Potter explains why her new film will go direct to our mobile phones, timesonline.co.uk, September 19, 2009.
 Melissa Silverstein, Interview with Sally Potter, Director of Rage, huffingtonpost.com, September 29, 2009.

2009 films
2000s English-language films
Films directed by Sally Potter
2009 comedy films
British comedy films
British satirical films
Films set in New York City
2000s British films